Samuel Bell may refer to:

 Samuel Bell (architect) (1739–1813), Scottish architect
 Samuel Dana Bell (1798–1868), Chief Justice of New Hampshire supreme court
 Samuel Bell (New Hampshire politician) (1770–1850), jurist, governor and U.S. Senator
 Samuel Bell (California politician) ( 1850s), 19th-century Controller of California
 Samuel Newell Bell (1829–1889), U.S. Congressman from New Hampshire
 Sam H. Bell (1925–2010), U.S. Federal judge for the northern district of Ohio
 Sam Bell (politician) (born 1989), American politician
 Sam Bell (footballer, born 1909) (1909–1982), English football forward
 Sam Bell (footballer, born 2002), English football midfielder

See also
 Sam Hanna Bell (1909–1990), Scottish novelist